Shabab Al-Ordon Club is a Jordanian professional football club based in Amman, that competes in the Jordanian Pro League. The club was established in 2002 and is considered as the newest club in Jordan, but originated from its club Al-Qadisiyah. Besides it being one of the most competitive football teams in Jordan and succeeding in several achievements in a very short period of time, as they occupied fourth in Jordanian League in 2004-2005 Winning the league in 2005-2006 and also winning the Jordan FA Cup at the same year.

History
In fact, Shabab Al-Ordon Club Management has played an important role in its success, particularly the president of club Salim Khair who spent his best efforts in order to meet the entire club's requirements to reach its best satisfaction. Furthermore, the greatest achievement of the club was materialized in 2007 in their success in winning AFC Cup.
Known as the Amman clubs noisy new neighbors, the Red and whites have been stirring up trouble on the field, popular for twisting and turning Al-Wehdat and Al-Faisaly title races while rarely being involved. in 2004–2007 Shabab were the most threatening, taking leagues and cups left and right, but since then, the form has dropped in Zarqa and mainly get there thrills by defeating the major Amman clubs and dashing title and cup ambitions.

2007 AFC Cup
Shabab Al-Ordon qualified for the 2007 AFC Cup, Asia's second-tier club tournament (Jordanian clubs did not pass the licensing requirements to participate in the AFC Champions League and thus were transferred to the AFC Cup). Shabab Al Ordon's continental bow started with a 2–0 victory over Yemen's Al-Saqr in Group A before 1–0 and 2–0 wins over Oman's Muscat and Nejmeh of Lebanon respectively saw the Amman side on maximum points after three games. 

The second half of the group stage was not as strong for the Jordanians as an away defeat to Nejmeh followed by a 1–1 draw with Al Saqr in Yemen saw the Lebanese side move into top spot. And it took a 2–1 victory over Muscat in the final group game to see Shabab Al Ordon advance as the best-placed runners-up in the West.

Shabab Al Ordon was then pitted against Singaporean opposition in the last eight with Armed Forces. Shabab Al Ordon enjoyed the perfect first leg by seeing off the Singapore side 5–0 in Amman, although complacency threatened to get the better of them in the return leg before a 3–0 defeat saw them progress 5–3 on aggregate. 

Three Jordanian teams reached the last four with Shabab Al-Ordon avoiding the local derby after being paired with Nejmeh, while Al-Faisaly faced a repeat of their 2006 semi-final against Al-Wehdat. In their third meeting of the competition Shabab Al Ordon's Odai Al-Saify scored the only goal of the game early on as the Amman side defeated Nejmeh 1–0, before a scoreless draw in the second leg in Beirut secured them a place in the final at the first time of asking.

Al Faisaly and Al Wehdat played out a 1–1 draw in their first leg at Amman International Stadium. Some 17,000 spectators turned out for the return leg at the same venue and it was Hassouneh Al-Sheikh who was the hero, scoring the decisive goal in a 2–1 victory.

For the third year in a row, Al Faisaly lined up for the tournament showpiece but, for the first time, they would have to overcome Jordanian opposition in the final to lift the title. After a scoreless first half, Odai Al Saify netted the only goal of the game in the 52nd minute as Shabab Al Ordon, technically the away team, ran out 1–0 winners. Haitham Al-Shboul then cancelled out that away goal by striking early in the second leg to tie the contest at 1–1 on aggregate. But Mustafa Shehdeh equalised on the stroke of half-time and, with no further goals, Al Faisaly's reign as AFC Cup champions was ended as Shabab Al Ordon were crowned kings of the continent.

Stadium
Shabab Al-Ordon plays their home games at King Abdullah II Stadium in Amman. The stadium was constructed in 1998 with a capacity of 13,000 people.

Kits
Shabab Al-Ordon's home kit is all red and white stripes, while their away kit is all black and white stripes.

Kit suppliers and shirt sponsors

Current squad

Current technical staff

Managerial history

Honours

Domestic (8 titles)

Continental (1 title)

Recent seasons
The table below chronicles the achievements of Shabab Al-Ordon in various competitions since 2004.

 P = Played
 W = Games won
 D = Games drawn
 L = Games lost
 F = Goals scored
 A = Goals against
 Pts = Points
 Pos = Final position

 W = Champion
 RU = Final (Runner-up)
 SF = Semi-finals
 QF = Quarter-finals
 R16/R32 = Round of 16, Round of 32, etc.
 GS =Group stage

References

External links
 (archived)
Team profile at kooora.com 

Association football clubs established in 2002
Football clubs in Jordan
Football clubs in Amman
Sport in Amman
2002 establishments in Jordan
AFC Cup winning clubs